Vinnytsia is a city in west-central Ukraine, located on the banks of the Southern Bug.

It is the administrative center of Vinnytsia Oblast and the largest city in the historic region of Podillia. Administratively, it is incorporated as a city of oblast significance. It also serves as an administrative center of Vinnytsia Raion, one of the 6 raions of Vinnytsia Oblast.

The city's roots date back to the Middle Ages. It was under Lithuanian and Polish control for centuries. During 1653-1667, Vinnytsia was a regimental city of the Hetman state, and in 1793 it was ceded to the Russian Empire. During the 1930s and early 1940s the city was the site of massacres, first during Stalin's purges and then during the Holocaust in Ukraine and the Nazi occupation. A Cold War–era airbase was located near the city. Currently, Vinnytsia is developing as one of the most comfortable cities for life in independent Ukraine.

Name
The name of Vinnytsia appeared for the first time in 1363. It is assumed that the name is derived from the old Slavic word "Vino", meaning "a bride price." This name can be explained by the fact that Vinnytsia and the surrounding land were captured by Lithuanian Duke Algirdas in the 14th century, and then, they were gifted to his nephews.

Geography

Location

It is the administrative center of Vinnytsia Oblast (province), as well as the administrative center of the surrounding Vinnytsia Raion within the oblast. The city itself is directly subordinated to the oblast.

Climate
The city has a warm-summer humid continental climate (Köppen: Dfb), similar to northern Pennsylvania in the United States in some respects.

A long-lasting warm summer with a sufficient quantity of moisture and a comparatively short winter is characteristic of Vinnytsia.

Over the course of a year there are around 6–9 days when snowstorms occur, 37–60 days when mists occur during the cold period, and 3–5 days when thunderstorms with hail occur.

Ecology and climate change 
On January 28, 2022, Vinnytsia City Council announced Vinnytsia Green Deal by signing the Declaration and approving the Roadmap of measures for the implementation of its principles and approaches within the community.

History

From Medieval to Modern times

Vinnytsia has been an important trade and political center since the fourteenth century, when Theodor Koriatovits, the nephew of the Lithuanian Duke Algirdas, built a fortress (1363) against Tatar raiders on the banks of the Southern Bug. The original settlement was built and populated by Aleksander Hrehorovicz Jelec, a hetman under Lithuanian Prince Švitrigaila. Aleksander Jelec built the fort, which he commanded as starosta afterwards.

In the 15th century, Lithuanian Grand Duke Alexander Jagiellon granted Vinnytsia Magdeburg city rights. In 1566, it became part of the Bracław Voivodeship. Between 1569 and 1793 the town was a part of Poland. In 1648, Vinnytsia found itself at the epicenter of the liberation struggle led by Bohdan Khmelnytskyi. In February 1651, during the defense of the city, Ivan Bohun's Cossack regiment defeated a 20,000-strong Polish army. Vinnytsia was part of the Hetman state until 1667, and during 1672-1699 was a part of the Ottoman Empire (and still part of the historic region of Podolia). During Polish rule, Vinnytsia was a Polish royal city. On 18 March 1783, Antoni Protazy Potocki opened the Trade Company Poland in Vinnytsia.

After the Second Partition of Poland in 1793 the Russian Empire annexed the city and the region. Russia moved to expunge the Roman Catholic religion. Catholic churches in the city, including what is currently the Transfiguration Cathedral, were converted to Russian Orthodox churches.

In the Russian census of 1897, Vinnytsia had a population of 30,563. It was the third largest city in Podolia region after Kamianets-Podilskyi and Uman. After railway connections were appeared in 1871, Vinnytsia developed rapidly economically and infrastructurally. The city architect Hryhorii Artynov erected a number of buildings (a water tower, a theater, churches, hotels and mansions), which still shape the city image.

During the Ukrainian Revolution of 1917-1920, Vinnytsia was chosen three times as the seat of government structures of the Ukrainian People's Republic. The residence of the Directory was Savoy Hotel, which turned the city into a de facto capital. On May 16, 1920, a meeting was held in Vinnytsia between the heads of Ukraine and Poland, Symon Petliura and Józef Piłsudski.

Soviet Vinnytsia becomes an industrial giant with an emphasis on sugar production, but it experiences the terrible famine of 1932-1933 in the shadow of its prosperity.

The Vinnytsia massacre was the mass execution of between 9,000 and 11,000 people in Vinnytsia by the Soviet secret police NKVD during the Great Purge in 1937–1938.

World War II

Vinnytsia was occupied by German troops on 19 July 1941 during World War II. While Vinnytsia had a pre-war Jewish population of over 34,000, only 17,000 of these Jews remained, with the rest of them successfully being evacuated to the interior of the Soviet Union beforehand. Virtually all of the Jews who remained in Vinnytsia under Nazi occupation were subsequently murdered in the Holocaust.

Adolf Hitler sited his eastern headquarters, Führerhauptquartier Werwolf or Wehrwolf, at the Wehrmacht headquarters near the town. The complex was built in 1941–1942 by Russian prisoners of war. Many of them were subsequently killed. Hitler's accommodation consisted of a log cabin built around a private courtyard with its own concrete bunker. The complex included about 20 other log buildings, a power station, gardens, wells, three bunkers, a swimming pool, and wire and defensive positions.

Hitler spent a number of weeks at Wehrwolf in 1942 and early 1943. The few remains of the Wehrwolf site, described in one report as a "pile of concrete" because it was destroyed by the Nazis in 1944, can be visited. Plans to create a full-fledged museum had not come to fruition as of August 2018.

Nazi atrocities were committed in and near Vinnytsia by Einsatzgruppe C. Estimates of the number of victims often run as high as 28,000. Historian Oliver Rathkolb states that 35,000 Jews were deported from the Vinnytsia region and most of those later died.

In 1942 a large part of the Jewish quarter of Yerusalimka was destroyed by Germans. One infamous photo, The Last Jew of Vinnytsia, shows a member of the Einsatzgruppe about to execute a Jewish man kneeling before a mass grave. The text The Last Jew of Vinnytsia was written on the back of the photograph, which was found in a photo album belonging to a German soldier. It was captured by the Red Army on 20 March 1944.

Soviet era
After the end of World War II, Vinnytsia was the home for major Soviet Air Forces base, including an airfield, a hospital, arsenals, and other military installations. The headquarters of the 43rd Rocket Army of the Strategic Rocket Forces was stationed in Vinnytsia from 1960 to the early 1990s. The 2nd Independent Heavy Bomber Aviation Corps, which later became 24th Air Army, was stationed in Vinnytsia from 1960 to 1992.

Independent Ukraine 
The Ukrainian Air Force Command has been based in Vinnytsia since 1992. During the 2022 Russian invasion of Ukraine, the command center was significantly damaged by Russian cruise missiles on 25 March 2022.

On 14 July 2022 the center of the city was attacked with three Russian cruise missiles. Missiles hit the local NeuroMed clinic and House of the Officers, which was currently used as a concert hall. Due to the strike 27 people were killed (three children among them), 80 were hospitalized. The next day the Russian Ministry of defense said that the target was top-ranking Ukrainian military officers and representatives of foreign military industry companies.

On October 12, 2022, a pilot Vadym Voroshylov (call sign Karaia) destroyed 5 "Shahed 136" drones near Vinnytsia. Due to damage to the plane, Vadym ejected in Vinnytsia oblast, having previously diverted the fighter jet from the settlement. For this, he was awarded the title of Hero of Ukraine.

Education and science 

Educational institutions of the city of Vinnytsia:

 58 preschool education institutions (56 - communal, 1 - state and 1 private forms of ownership). Electronic registration is available for enrolling children in communally owned pre-school education institutions;
 45 institutions of general secondary education (37 communal and 8 private forms of ownership). 
 8 institutions of state-owned professional (vocational and technical) education;
 3 community-owned out-of-school education institutions:
 Vinnytsia City Palace of Children and Youth;
 Vinnytsia city center of artistic and choreographic education of children and youth "Barvinok";
 Center for Extracurricular Education "School of Success".

There are many universities and research institutions in Vinnytsia:
 Mykola Pirogov Vinnytsia National Medical University;
 Vinnytsia National Agrarian University;
 Vinnytsia National Technical University;
 Mykhailo Kotsiubynskyi Vinnytsia State Pedagogical University;
 Vasyl Stus Donetsk National University, evacuated from Donetsk in 2014 due to Russian armed invasion in eastern Ukraine;
 Vinnytsia European University;
 Vinnytsia Institute of Trade and Economics of Kyiv National University of Trade and Economics;
 Vinnytsia Institute of Economics and Social Sciences.

There is also the Regional Universal Scientific Library named after prominent local historian Valentyn Otamanovskyi in Vinnytsia.

Economy

Vinnytsia is a prominent industrial city in Ukraine.

There are Roshen confectionery corporation, Crystal diamond polishing corporation, RPC Fort largest Ukrainian firearms manufacturing corporation,  Mayak corporation, Budmash corporation, Pnevmatyka corporation, PlasmaTec corporation, a parquet board manufacturer Barlinek Invest, Vinnytsia Oil and Fat Plant, Vinnytsia Food and Gustatory Factory PJSC, Agrana Food LLC and others.

Industrial Parks and Investments 

There are 3 industrial parks on the territory of Vinnytsia City Territorial Community that are included in the Register of Industrial Parks of Ukraine: Vinnytsia Industrial Park (with an area of 35.7 ha), Industrial Park Vinnytsia Cluster of Refrigeration Engineering (with an area of 19.27 ha), Industrial Park Winter Sport (with an area of 25 ha). The facilities of UBC Cool (production of refrigeration equipment for food and beverages), KNESS (production of solar panels) are already operating on the basis of industrial parks, HEAD plant (production of equipment for winter sports) is under construction.

Digital and Creative Economy 

Vinnytsia is among the TOP-5 cities in terms of the number of specialists in IT. This sector is represented, in particular, by the following companies: Gemicle, Incoresoft, Delphi Software, Playtika, Onseo, Astound Commerce, EPAM Ukraine, Spilna Sprava, Infopulse, SteelKiwi, Exadel, Ciklum, Lampa, R4x, RIA Internet Group. The main office of LetyShops, the largest cashback service in Ukraine, the leader in this market segment, is located in the city.

Also in Vinnytsia, the project of the Innovation and Technology Park ″Krystal″ is being implemented. This is the first municipal innovation and technology park in Ukraine, which will be aimed at strengthening existing and creating new high-tech and creative industries in the city of Vinnytsia and the Podillia region. Innovation and technology park Krystal is an example of renovation of production premises of old enterprises and their transformation into points of growth of creative economy and small entrepreneurship.

Clusters 

As part of the decentralized cooperation program between the city of Vinnytsia and Vinnytsia region with the city of Dijon, the Burgundy-Franche-Comté region, AgroVin agricultural cluster was created in March 2021. The participants of the agrocluster are processing enterprises of the city of Vinnytsia, agricultural producers and specialized scientific institutions (Agrana Fruit Ukraine LLC, Vinnytsia Food and Gustatory Factory PJSC,, Agroposluhtransservis LLC,Dibrova LLC, Organik-d LLC, Vinnytsia National Agrarian University, Institute of Fodder and Agriculture of Podillia National Academy of Sciences).

Vinnytsia Instrumentation and Automation Cluster was created in February 2021 by local enterprises (Promavtomatyka-Vinnytsia LLC, Innovinprom LLC, Maitek Plus LLC, Grampis LLC, Tiras LLC, Vinaerogis LLC, and others) that work in the instrument-making industry and are engaged in the automation of production with the aim of creating competitive products, creating jobs for the best local graduates, promoting the definition and implementation of smart specialization of the city territorial community and the region.

Military 
The headquarters of the Ukrainian Air Force is situated in Vinnytsia.

Politics

Vinnytsia is considered the long-time political base for Ukrainian oligarch and former President Petro Poroshenko. He owns a local confectionery (as part of the Roshen Corporation) and was elected member of parliament from the local constituency for several convocations. However, contrary to some speculations, Poroshenko has never lived in the city.

Volodymyr Groysman, the former Ukrainian Prime Minister (2016-2019) is from Vinnytsia.

Parks and squares 

Central urban park in Vinnytsia

Park of Culture and Recreation named after Mykola Leontovych located in Vinnytsia city between the streets Soborna (center), Mahistratska and Khmelnytske Shose.

The park is 40 hectares.

There are numerous monuments (soldiers in Afghanistan, Sich Riflemen, killed police officers, victims of NKVD’s purge), and the Alley of outstanding countrymen are objects of leisure and recreation: a summer theater, a stadium, an ice club, a city planetarium, a fountain, a chess club, Mini-Vinnytsia open air museum, numerous attractions and gaming machines.

For more than 70 years of its history, the Central Park has always been a place of celebrations and recreation for the residents and for holding local/municipal events and holidays. It became a fine tradition to hold folk festivals and all major holidays in the Park, in particular on the City Day, Europe Day, Independence Day, and more.

Buildings and Structures 

 Saint Nicholas Church is considered to be the oldest building in the city — built in 1746 in the place of older one; 
 The Transfiguration Cathedral, built in Vinnytsia in 1758 by Italian architect Paolo Fontana;
 Church of the Holy Virgin Mary Angelic, built in 1748—1761 as Capuchin monastery;
 The National Pirogov's Estate Museum and church where his embaled body preserved. Built in 1866—1885, opened for visitors as a museum in 1947;
 The Literary and Memorial Museum of a “great Sun Worshiper”,a classical author of Ukrainian literature Mykhailo Kotsiubynsky, built in 1860-1890th and opened for visitors as a museum in 1927;
 Vinnytsia water tower, built in 1912 by city main architect Hryhorii Artynov;
 Savoy Hotel, built in 1912—1913;
 Vaksman family's real estate, built in 1915 in Art Nouveau style. Address: 24, Symona Petliury Street. Built by architect Moisey Aaronovitch Vaksman. Architectural landmark;
 TV Tower Vinnytsia — the tallest guyed tubular steel mast in the world, built in 1961;
 The new Greek Catholic Church at South Bug river, built in 1993—1996;
 Baptist Church ″Evangelical House″– reportedly one of the largest Evangelical Church buildings in Europe, built in 1996;
 Seventh-day Adventist Church, built in 2000th;
 Multimedia Fountain Roshen, built in 2011, it is considered one of the largest floating fountains in Europe. It is the major multimedia attraction in the city.

In the city, numerous historical buildings are being repaired and new ones are being built.

Transport

Air

Havryshivka Vinnytsia International Airport (IATA: VIN, ICAO: UKWW) is situated near Vinnytsia.

Railway

There is a railway station in Vinnytsia, which is a part of 'South-Western Railway'. In 2013 it was named among 10 biggest railway stations in Ukraine. The current Vinnytsia railway station was built in 1952 and is the 4th railway building in Vinnytsia. The previous three were destroyed.

Vinnytsia is an important transport hub for internal and external railway connections. Most of the international trains which cross through Ukraine have a stop in Vinnytsia. For example, trains to Przemyśl (Poland) and from Sofia (Bulgaria), Chisinau (Moldova), Bratislava (Slovakia), Belgrade (Serbia), Budapest (Hungary) transit through Vinnytsia. For internal railway connections, Vinnytsia is also an important transport point for trains heading to Western Ukraine (Lviv, Khmelnytskyi, Chernivtsi), the South (Odesa), as well as to Central Ukraine (Kyiv).

Tram 

The tram is the most popular public transport in Vinnytsia. There are six tram routes in Vinnytsia:

The most trams in Vinnytsia are donations from the Verkehrsbetriebe Zürich (VBZ), the public transport operator of Zürich, Switzerland. In the early 2000s, the VBZ donated its 1960s Karpfen and Mirage rolling stock to Vinnytsia, and they will do so again in 2022 with 35 Tram 2000 vehicles. The Swiss trams retain their blue and white liveries in Vinnytsian service.

Since 2015, "Vinnytsia Transport Company" began manufacturing VinWay trams based on Tatra KT4SU wagons and VinLine trolleybuses. As of 2022, 10 modernized trams and 15 trolleybuses are running in the city.

Bus
There are the Central Bus Station and the Western Bus Station in Vinnytsia.

Health Care 

As for the 2022, the city's health care system is represented by more than 40 treatment and preventive medical institutions, 16 of which are communally owned by the city of Vinnytsia. There are more than 60 private medical institutions.

Vinnytsia Regional Clinical Hospital named after Mykola Pirogov of Vinnytsia Regional Council was founded in Vinnytsia in 1805 as the first municipal hospital, and under the name of Mykola Pirogov has been operating since 1917.
Today, the hospital is a multidisciplinary, highly specialized, curative and preventive health care institution, whose mandate is to provide medical assistance to patients in 22 specialized areas. 12 clinical departments and cycles of Vinnytsia National Medical University named after Mykola Pirogov are located in the centers and departments of the hospital.

Vinnytsia Regional Clinical Treatment and Diagnostic Center for Cardiovascular Pathology is a specialized medical facility that provides routine and emergency medical care to patients with diseases of the circulatory system. The institution has 5 departments and a clinical diagnostic laboratory, where 186 medical workers work. The operating units of the center provides coronary angiography (diagnostics of heart vessels), stenting of damaged arteries, open heart surgery.

Sport and Sportsmen 

FC Nyva Vinnytsia (former "Locomotive") was created in 1958. During the Soviet Union, "Niva" from Vinnytsia was on good terms, not among the best, but it showed decent results against the background of other clubs of the Ukrainian SSR. Vinnytsia won the championship of the republic twice, in 1964 and 1984, and in 1972 and 1973 Lokomotiv even won the Cup of Ukraine. On January 21, 2021, Niva player Artur Zahorulko became the club's president.

Vinnytsia is the base of the Ukrainian field hockey. 2 leading Ukrainian teams are registered here: "Hockey Club Olympia-Kolos-Sequoia" (HC OKS-SHVSM)  and "Dynamo-ShVSM-VDPU".

Vinnytsia is known for playing sports such as basketball. There are two professional teams: the women's "Vinnytsia Lightnings" and the men's "Vinnytsia Bisons". "Vinnytsia Bisons" is a fairly well-known brand in Vinnytsia and Ukrainian sports. This men's basketball team twice won silver medals and once - bronze of the higher league of the championship of Ukraine in 2018. Mykola Zdyrka, head coach of "Bisons", is a master of sports.

In 2006, the first American football championship of Ukraine took place, in which "Vinnytsia Wolves" took second place. In 2013, 6 "Wolves" players were invited to be selected for the national American football team of Ukraine. Three of them became part of it. In 2014, the team started playing in the higher league, where they played in the group stage with Kyiv "Bandits", Odesa "Pirates" and Kyiv "Vityaz". 2017 — silver medalists of the ULAF Championship of Ukraine. The youth teams of the Vinnytsia Wolves sports club, which formed the basis of two national flag football teams of Ukraine, became participants in the New Generation Bowl 2022 and returned home with achievements. The U15 national team won the silver cup of the tournament, and the U17 team won the bronze. Wolves Cheerleaders is the best cheerleading team in Ukraine. 

Vinnytsia Olympians

Pavlo Khnykin — swimmer, two-time silver medalist of the 1992 Summer Olympics;
Inna Osypenko-Radomska — sprint kayaker, champion of the Olympic Games in Beijing, silver medalist at the Olympic Games in London in single kayak rowing (distance of 500 and 200 meters) and bronze medalist of the Olympic Games in Athens as part of the women's foursome, world champion in Poznan (Poland) K1 500 meters; 
Hanna Balabanova — sprint canoeist, bronze medalist of the Olympic Games in Athens.

Vinnytsia boxers

Serhii Bohachuk — Vinnytsia boxer, WBC Continental Americas title holder;
Viacheslav Uzielkov — WBA Intercontinental light heavyweight boxing champion, politician and TV-presenter;
Roman Holovashchenko — international (2009—2010) and intercontinental champion (2017—2018) according to the IBO version, world champion according to the GBC version (2009—2010), European champion according to the IBF version (2016);

Culture 

Theaters of the city

 Vinnytsia State Academic Music and Drama Theater named after Mykola Sadovskyi, founded in 1910;
 Vinnytsia Academic Regional Puppet Theater "Zolotyi Kliuchyk" — one of the oldest in Ukraine (founded in October 1938);
 Vinnytsia Regional Philharmonic named after Mykola Leontovych, founded in 1937.

List of the museums

 The National Pirogov's Estate Museum;   
 Vinnytsia Regional Museum of Local Lore; 
 Vinnytsia Regional Art Museum; 
 Military-historical Museum of the Air Force of the Armed Forces of Ukraine;
 Vinnytsia Literary and Memorial Museum of Mykhailo Kotsiubynskyi;
 Oleh Lutsyshyn Pottery Museum; 
 Vinnytsia Tram Museum; 
 AutoMotoVeloFotoTeleRadio Museum;
 Museum of the Ukrainian postage stamp named after Yakiv Balaban;
 Museum of transport models;
 Holocaust Museum in Vinnytsia;
 Museum of Jewish life.

Notable people

 
 
 Nathan Altman (1889–1970) a Jewish and Soviet avant-garde artist, Cubist painter, stage designer and book illustrator;
 Larysa Artiugina (born 1971) a Ukrainian documentary film director and activist;
 Sam Born (1891–1959) an American businessman, candy maker and inventor;
 Matvei Petrovich Bronstein (1906–1938) a theoretical physicist, a pioneer of quantum gravity;
 Valeriy Chaly (born 1970) diplomat; Ambassador of Ukraine to the USA from 2015–2019;
 Todros Geller (1889–1949) a Jewish American artist, teacher and master printmaker;
 Volodymyr Groysman (born 1978) politician, Prime Minister of Ukraine 2016-2019;
 Victoria Koblenko (born 1980) Dutch actress, presenter and columnist;
 Mykhailo Kotsiubynsky (1864–1913) author of novels and short stories. His home is a museum;
 Volodymyr Kozhukhar (1941–2022) conductor and academic teacher;
 Mykola Leontovych (1877–1921) Ukrainian composer who worked here;
 Alexander Lerner (1913–2004) Soviet-Israeli cyberneticist and dissident;
 Yuri Levada (1930–2006) sociologist, political scientist and the founder of the Levada Center;
 Yitzkhok Yoel Linetzky (1839–1915) a Yiddish language author and early Zionist; 
 Anatoly Lysenko (1937–2021) a Soviet and Russian TV figure, journalist, director and producer;
 Marina (born 1989) Polish singer of Ukrainian origin;
 Jerzy Niezbrzycki (1902–1968) captain of the Polish Army;
 Alla Pavlova (b. 1952), composer;
 Nikolay Pirogov (1810–1881) originally from Moscow, an Imperial Russian doctor, founder of field surgery, spent his later years in Vinnytsia; his home is a museum;
 Olya Polyakova (born 1979) a Ukrainian singer, actress, TV presenter and comedian;
 Maksym Shapoval (1978–2017) intelligence officer and head of a special forces of the Ukrainian Chief Directorate of Intelligence; assassinated by Russian agents in 2017;
 Vladyslav Skalsky (born 1976) a Ukrainian civil servant and politician;
 Olga Storozhenko (born 1992) Miss Ukraine Universe 2013 & Top 10 Miss Universe 2013;
 Mykola Tochytskyi (born 1967) diplomat, politician and deputy Minister of Foreign Affairs;
 Leonid Isaakovich Vail (1883–1945) a Jewish Painter and art theorist;
 Selman Waksman (1888–1973) American biochemist and microbiologist, Nobel prizewinner, born near Vinnytsia;
 Inna Abramovna Zhvanetskaia (born 1937) composer, piano teacher and lecturer.

Sport 
 Serhiy Cherniavskiy (born 1976) a cyclist; silver medallist at the 2000 Summer Olympics;
 Sergey Fedorchuk (born 1981) a Ukrainian Grandmaster chess player;
 Pavlo Khnykin (born 1969) freestyle swimmer, team silver medallist at the 1992 Summer Olympics;
 Illia Nyzhnyk (born 1996) a Ukrainian chess grandmaster;
 Sergei Polyakov (born 1968) a Russian sport shooter, silver medallist at the 2004 Summer Olympics.

International relations

Twin towns – Sister cities
Vinnytsia is twinned with:

Gallery

See also

 FC Nyva Vinnytsia
 TIK
 Vinnytsia massacre
 Vinnytsia tram
 Werwolf (Wehrmacht HQ) – the codename used for one of Adolf Hitler's World War II Eastern Front military headquarters. It was one of the most easterly ever used by Hitler in person.

Notes

References

External links
 
 
 
  

 
Cities in Vinnytsia Oblast
Oblast centers in Ukraine
Populated places on the Southern Bug
Cities of regional significance in Ukraine
14th-century establishments in Ukraine
1363 establishments in Europe
Populated places established in the 1360s
Bratslav Voivodeship
Cossack Hetmanate
Vinnitsky Uyezd
Holocaust locations in Ukraine
Articles containing video clips
Ukrainian Air Force
Jewish communities destroyed in the Holocaust